The Robert Award for Best Director is presented at an annual Robert Award show hosted by the Danish Film Academy. The category was introduced in 2001 and all directors of Danish films irrespective of the language of the film are eligible. The winner is selected among five nominees.

Honorees

2000s 
 2001: Per Fly for The Bench
 Natasha Arthy nominated for Mirakel
  and  nominated for Help! I'm a Fish
 Lone Scherfig nominated for Italian for Beginners
 Lars von Trier nominated for Dancer in the Dark
 2002: Ole Christian Madsen for Kira's Reason: A Love Story
 Gert Fredholm nominated for One-Hand Clapping
 Hella Joof nominated for Shake It All About
  nominated for 
 Kristian Levring nominated for The King Is Alive
 2003: Nils Malmros for Facing the Truth
 Susanne Bier nominated for Open Hearts
 Jesper W. Nielsen nominated for Okay
 Helle Ryslinge nominated for 
 Lone Scherfig nominated for Wilbur Wants to Kill Himself
 2004: Per Fly for The Inheritance
 Christoffer Boe nominated for Reconstruction
 Anders Thomas Jensen nominated for Open Hearts
 Jannik Johansen nominated for Stealing Rembrandt
 Lars von Trier nominated for Dancer in the Dark
 2005: Nikolaj Arcel for King's Game
 Annette K. Olsen nominated for In Your Hands
 Nicolas Winding Refn nominated for Pusher II
 Simon Staho nominated for Day and Night
 Paprika Steen nominated for Aftermath
 2006: Per Fly for Manslaughter
 Christoffer Boe nominated for Allegro
 Anders Thomas Jensen nominated for Adam's Apples
 Åke Sandgren nominated for 
 Lars von Trier nominated for Manderlay
 2007: Niels Arden Oplev for We Shall Overcome
 Christoffer Boe nominated for Offscreen
 Christian E. Christiansen nominated for Life Hits
 Pernille Fischer Christensen nominated for A Soap
 Ole Christian Madsen and Valerie Faris nominated for Prague
 Anders Morgenthaler nominated for Princess
 2008: Peter Schønau Fog for The Art of Crying
 Nikolaj Arcel nominated for Island of Lost Souls
 Ole Bornedal nominated for Just Another Love Story
 Anders Morgenthaler nominated for Echo
 Simon Staho nominated for Daisy Diamond
 2009: Henrik Ruben Genz for Terribly Happy
 Kristian Levring nominated for Fear Me Not
 Ole Christian Madsen nominated for Flame & Citron
 Annette K. Olesen nominated for 
 Niels Arden Oplev nominated for Worlds Apart

2010s 
 2010: Lars von Trier for Antichrist
 Ole Bornedal nominated for Deliver Us from Evil
 Hella Joof nominated for 
 Rumle Hammerich nominated for Headhunter
 Nils Malmros nominated for Aching Hearts
 2011: Tobias Lindholm and Michael Noer for R
 Nikolaj Arcel nominated for The Truth About Men
 Susanne Bier nominated for In a Better World
 Nicolo Donato (film director) nominated for Brotherhood
 Thomas Vinterberg nominated for Submarino
 2012: Lars von Trier for Melancholia
 Pernille Fischer Christensen nominated for A Family
 Ole Christian Madsen nominated for SuperClásico
 Carlos Augusto de Oliveira nominated for Rosa Morena
 Martin Zandvliet nominated for A Funny Man
 2013: Nikolaj Arcel for A Royal Affair
 2014: Thomas Vinterberg for The Hunt
 2015: Lars von Trier for Nymphomaniac Director's Cut
 2016: Martin Zandvliet for Land of Mine
 2017: Christian Tafdrup for Parents
 2018: Hlynur Pálmason for Winter Brothers
 2019:  for The Guilty

2020'erne 
 2020: May el-Toukhy for Dronningen
 2021: Thomas Vinterberg for Another Round
 Anders Thomas Jensen nominated for Riders of Justice
 Christina Rosendahl nominated for The Good Traitor
  nominated for 
  nominated for A Perfectly Normal Family

References

External links 
  

2001 establishments in Denmark
Awards established in 2001
Awards for best director
Director